This is a list of fictional pirates, organized into either air pirates, sea pirates, or space pirates. They may be outlaws, but are not the same as space marines or space cowboys in space westerns. To learn more about pirates and their context in popular culture as a whole, see the Pirates in popular culture and List of pirate films pages.

Within in each category, the characters are organized alphabetically by surname (i.e. last name), or by single name if the character does not have a surname. If more than two characters are in one entry, the last name of the first character is used.

Sea pirates

Air pirates

Space pirates

See also
 The Five Gold Bands
 Roberto Cofresí in popular culture
 Lego Pirates
 Il pirata
 Polly and the Pirates
 Red Seas Under Red Skies
 The Red Seas
List of pirates

Notes

References

External links
 Pirates in pop culture, CNN, September 18, 2015
 Pirates in popular culture, page by Mandeville Special Collections Library, 2013
 Roger Luckhurst, The timeless allure of pirates, BBC, June 21, 2017
 10 of Our Favorite Pop Culture Pirates, Flavorwire, Spetmber 19, 2011

 

Maritime folklore